BC Politekhnik, is a Ukrainian basketball club based in Kharkiv. Established in 1991, it played in the Ukrainian Basketball SuperLeague in 1992, 2004–2007 and 2016–2019.

History
After the 2018–19 season, Politekhnik left the SuperLeague as it could not give financial guarantees. Instead, Kharkivski Sokoly from the city of Kharkiv received a spot for the 2019–20 campaign.

In 2021–22 season, the club plays in the third division of Ukrainian basketball.

Honours
Ukrainian Higher League
Winners (1): 2015–16

Season by season

Players

Current squad

Notable players
  Roman Kozlov 7 seasons: 2012–19
  Delwan Graham 1 season: 2018–19

References

External links
Official website

Basketball teams in Ukraine
Basketball teams established in 1991
Sport in Kharkiv
1991 establishments in Ukraine